Nonato is a name. It may refer to:

People
 Nonato (footballer, born 1979), Raimundo Nonato de Lima Ribeiro, Brazilian football forward
 Nonato (footballer, born 1998), Gustavo Nonato Santana, Brazilian football midfielder

Places
 São Raimundo Nonato, city in Piauí, Brazil
 Iglesia San Ramón Nonato, Roman Catholic church in Juana Díaz, Puerto Rico